The 2016–17 Macedonian Handball Super League (known as the VIP Super Liga for sponsorship reasons) was the 25th season of the Super League, Macedonia's premier Handball league.

Team information 

The following 12 clubs compete in the Super League during the 2016–17 season:

Regular season

Standings

Top scorers

Playoffs

Pld - Played; W - Won; D - Drawn; L - Lost; GF - Goals for; GA - Goals against; Diff - Difference; Pts - Points.

Play-out

Pld - Played; W - Won; D - Drawn; L - Lost; GF - Goals for; GA - Goals against; Diff - Difference; Pts - Points.

Relegation play-off 

Handball competitions in North Macedonia
2015 in Republic of Macedonia sport
2016 in Republic of Macedonia sport
2016–17 domestic handball leagues